is a railway station in the city of Itoigawa, Niigata, Japan, operated by Echigo Tokimeki Railway.

Outline 
After the Hokuriku Shinkansen was extended to Kanazawa Station, the parallel Hokuriku Main Line was transferred to the newly established third-sector public-private company, Echigo Tokimeki Railway. After the transfer, Niigata Prefecture and the railway company considered installing a new station near a local school and hospital to increase profits and break even with operational costs. In September 2019, MLIT approved the installation of the then tentatively named "Oshiage Shineki" station, which later became the Echigo Oshiage Hisui Kaigan Station. The cost of installing the new station was subsidized by JRTT and the local government.

History 
 2019 - Approved by Bureau of Hokuriku Transportation to install a new station tentatively named Oshiage Shineki.
 2020
 14 March - Started construction of the new station.
 10 June - Public survey conducted for a new station name
 9 August - The name Echigo Oshiage Hisui Kaigan Station was chosen based on the survey.
2021
 13 March 2021 - Opened for business.

Surrounding area
Hisui Coast

References

External links
Official website

Railway stations in Niigata Prefecture
Railway stations in Japan opened in 2021